Thomas Calcraft (1738–1783) was an English politician and Lieutenant-Colonel. He was the Member of Parliament for Poole from 1761 to 1774.

Life 

He was born in Ancaster, Lincolnshire. His brother was John Calcraft.

He was elected Member of Parliament at the 1761 British general election.

Together with his fellow MP Joseph Gulston, he is credited with financing Poole Guildhall.

References 

1738 births
1783 deaths
Members of the Parliament of Great Britain for English constituencies
People from South Kesteven District
People from Poole
British MPs 1761–1768
British MPs 1768–1774